Kolah Ghermezi and Pesar Khaleh is a 1995 Iranian film directed by Iraj Tahmasb. The film is about Kolah Ghermezi, a popular puppet character of the early 1990s in Iran.

Plot

During Kolah Ghermezi education, his mischief causes the principle to suspend him, during his suspension his love for Cinema, partially a Talk Show starring Mr. Mojri, with enough Inspiration, Kolah Ghermezi with the help of his Cousin (Pesar Khale) head to Tehran to meet with Mr. Mojri. Only to deal with more problems

Characters
Kolah Ghermezi
Pesar Khaleh
Mr. Mojri

References

External links

1995 films
Films directed by Iraj Tahmasb
Kolah Ghermezi
1990s Persian-language films
Iranian children's films